Jeremiah E. Joyce (born January 3, 1943) is an American lawyer and politician.

Born in Chicago, Illinois, Joyce received his bachelor's degree from Northern Illinois University, his masters from Chicago State University, and his J.D. degree from DePaul University College of Law. Early in his career, he was a history teacher, a Chicago police officer, and an assistant state's attorney for the criminal division of the Cook County State's Attorney. He also worked as an adjutant at Saint Xavier College and of the John Marshall Law School. He served on the Chicago City Council as Alderman from the 19th ward from April 1, 1975, until resigning to become state senator on February 1, 1979. He served on the Illinois State Senate 1979-1993 as a Democrat. In 1999, Joyce was appointed to the Northern Illinois University Board of Trustees where he served until 2001.

His son Kevin Joyce also served in the Illinois General Assembly. Another son, Jeremiah Joyce, Jr., ran for Mayor of Chicago in the 2019 mayoral election.

Notes

1943 births
Living people
Lawyers from Chicago
Northern Illinois University alumni
Chicago State University alumni
DePaul University College of Law alumni
Chicago City Council members
Democratic Party Illinois state senators